The men's doubles tennis event at the 2018 Asian Games took place at the Tennis Court of Jakabaring Sport City, Palembang, Indonesia from 19 to 24 August 2018.

Chung Hyeon and Lim Yong-kyu were the defending champions, however Chung chose not to compete. Lim partnered alongside Kwon Soon-woo, but lost to Gong Maoxin and Zhang Ze in the third round. Rohan Bopanna and Divij Sharan won the gold medal, defeating Alexander Bublik and Denis Yevseyev in the final. Sho Shimabukuro and Kaito Uesugi, and Yuya Ito and Yosuke Watanuki won the bronze medals.

Schedule
All times are Western Indonesia Time (UTC+07:00)

Results

Finals

Top half

Section 1

Section 2

Bottom half

Section 3

Section 4

References
 Draw

External links
Official website

Tennis at the 2018 Asian Games